Islom Tukhtahujaev (Uzbek Cyrillic: Ислом Тўхтахўжаев; born 30 October 1989 in Fergana) is an Uzbek footballer who plays as a defender for Al Gharafa.

Career
Islom is an Uzbek youth international, having represented his country at every level from Under-19 to Under-20. He was also capped for the senior national team.

Career statistics

Club career statistics
Statistics accurate as of match played 11 October 2020.

International goals
Scores and results list Uzbekistan's goal tally first.

Honours
Lokomotiv
Uzbek League: 2016, 2017
Uzbek Cup: 2014, 2016, 2017
Uzbekistan Super Cup: 2015

References

External links

1989 births
Living people
Uzbekistani footballers
Uzbekistan youth international footballers
Uzbekistan international footballers
2015 AFC Asian Cup players
Footballers at the 2010 Asian Games
Footballers at the 2014 Asian Games
Association football defenders
PFC Lokomotiv Tashkent players
Liaoning Shenyang Urban F.C. players
2019 AFC Asian Cup players
People from Fergana
Asian Games competitors for Uzbekistan
China League One players
Expatriate footballers in China
Uzbekistani expatriate footballers
Uzbekistani expatriate sportspeople in China